Chiselbury is the site of an Iron Age univallate hillfort located in Wiltshire. A gap in the southeastern side of the rampart, and a corresponding causeway across the ditch, is thought to be the original entrance and is associated with a small 'D' shaped embanked enclosure, which is apparently visible on aerial photographs. Although the enclosure has subsequently been degraded by ploughing, it is still apparent as a series of low earthworks.

Limited archaeological investigation of the interior of the hillfort in the early 20th century failed to find any direct traces of occupation. However, outside of the fort some Iron Age pottery and a lead spindle whorl were found. In addition, two Roman coins, one of which dated to the reign of Emperor Constantine I, were said to have been found within the central area. An Iron Age sword and scabbard were also found on the nearby trackway which runs along the ridge top.

The hillfort is abutted on both its northern and southern sides by embanked ditches or cross dykes. Their precise function is unknown but the manner in which they cut the ridge suggests that they were intended to prevent movement along it. The Northern Cross dyke,  in length, ran from the ditch of the hillfort across the top of the ridge before continuing part way down its northern slopes. Although visible in 1928, the section between the hillfort and the edge of the ridge has subsequently been infilled by ploughing, but survives as a buried feature. It travels roughly south-southeast from the 'D' shaped enclosure, down the southern slope of the ridge, and into the base of a valley.

An aerial photograph from 1928 clearly shows the southern cross dyke continuing as a buried feature beneath a trackway which runs along the ridge top, indicating that the trackway came into use after the cross dyke was constructed. An Anglo-Saxon charter also mentions 'the ridgeway' suggesting that the trackway was in use by at least the early medieval period. Referred to as the 'Ten Mile Course' by Dr. Stukeley in 1776, in the medieval and post-medieval periods the trackway was the main route from Wilton to Shaftesbury. By the 18th century it had become a turnpike road, and a map dated to 1773 depicts a toll house immediately to the south of it. The remains of the former toll house structure are visible today as a series of earthworks representing a building platform with a small enclosure immediately to its east.

The site is a scheduled national monument no.1020262.

Today, the site is also famous for the Fovant Badges, which are a number of regimental badges cut into the chalk of the hill on its northern flank. These were created by soldiers garrisoned near Fovant during the First World War, and are clearly visible from the A30 which runs through the village.

Location
The hill has a summit of 201m AOD. There are public footpaths and bridleways to the east and south of the site.

See also 
 List of places in Wiltshire
 List of hill forts in England
 List of hill forts in Scotland
 List of hill forts in Wales

References



Iron Age sites in England
Buildings and structures in Wiltshire
Hill forts in Wiltshire
Archaeological sites in Wiltshire